The 2004–05 Omani League was the 29th edition of the top football league in Oman. It began on 23 September 2004 and finished on 19 May 2005. Al-Nasr S.C.S.C. were the defending champions, having won the previous 2003–04 Omani League season. On Thursday, 19 May 2005, Dhofar S.C.S.C. played out a 1–1 draw away in their final league match against Al-Nasr S.C.S.C. and emerged as the champions of the 2004–05 Omani League with a total of 46 points.

Teams
This season the league had increased from 12 to 13 teams. Al-Suwaiq Club and Saham SC were relegated to the Second Division League after finishing in the relegation zone in the 2003–04 season. The two relegated teams were replaced by Second Division League teams Al-Ahli Club, Al-Ittihad Club and Bahla Club.

Stadia and locations

League table

Results

Season statistics

Top scorers

Media coverage

See also
2004 Sultan Qaboos Cup

References

Top level Omani football league seasons
1
Oman